Finkenbach is a river of Hesse and Baden-Württemberg, Germany. At its confluence with the Ulfenbach in Hirschhorn, the Laxbach is formed.

See also
List of rivers of Hesse
List of rivers of Baden-Württemberg

References

Rivers of Hesse
Rivers of Baden-Württemberg
Rivers of Germany